Mark Buntzman (July 31, 1949 – June 8, 2018) was the film director, writer, producer and actor of the cult classic movie Exterminator 2. He was also the producer of its predecessor The Exterminator. Other than those two movies, he hasn't produced, directed, or written any other prominent films. He did, though, have a cameo in the 1993 movie Posse as Deputy Buntzman, as well as playing a reporter in the 1995 movie Panther. Both movies starred Mario Van Peebles, who also played a large role in Exterminator 2.

Filmography
 Standing Knockdown (1999) [Producer]
 Love Kills (1998) [Producer] [Actor....The Accountant]
 Panther (1995) [Actor....Pushy reporter]
 Posse (1993) [Actor....Deputy Buntzman]
 Exterminator 2 (1984) [Producer] [Director] [Writer]
 The Exterminator (1980) [Producer] [Actor...Burping Ghoul]
 Suicide Cult (1975) [Producer] [Actor....Kajerste]

References

External links

1949 births
2018 deaths
American film producers
American film directors
American male film actors
American male screenwriters